The 25th Grey Cup was played on December 11, 1937, before 11,522 fans at Varsity Stadium at Toronto.

The Toronto Argonauts defeated the Winnipeg Blue Bombers 4–3.

Until 2021, this was the latest in the calendar year that any Grey Cup was played. The record was broken by one day at the 108th Grey Cup, which was played on December 12 due to the 2021 CFL season being delayed by the COVID-19 pandemic in Canada.

External links
 
 

Grey Cup
Grey Cups hosted in Toronto
Grey Cup
1937 in Ontario
December 1937 sports events
1930s in Toronto
Toronto Argonauts
Winnipeg Blue Bombers